Tampereen Pyrintö, more commonly referred to as shortly Pyrintö, is a Finnish basketball team from Tampere. It is the basketball section of a club with the same name. Pyrintö's men's and women's teams play in Korisliiga, the highest tier of Finnish basketball.

After 2010 Pyrintö has participated internationally in the EuroChallenge and the Baltic Basketball League.

Achievements 
Korisliiga: 3 
Champions: 2010, 2011, 2014
Runner-up: 1958, 1980, 1981, 2001, 2016
Third–place: 2009
Finnish Basketball Cup: 2
Champions: 1969, 2013
Runner-up: 2000, 2009, 2011, 2019, 2021
Baltic Basketball League
Fourth–place: 2014

Current roster

Retired numbers

All numbers are hanging in the rafters of the home arena, but current players can still play with them excluding Williams′ #32.

Notable players 

To appear in this section a player must have either: played at least one season for the club, set a club record or won an individual award while at the club, played at least one official international match for their national team at any time or performed very successfully during period in the club or at later/previous stages of his career.

Women's team 
Pyrintö's women's team currently plays in Women's Korisliiga, the highest tier of basketball for women in Finland, and has won eight Finnish titles and the Finnish Cup once. Among club's women's team, Pyrintö has retired the jersey of Seija Leino.

References

External links 
 

Basketball teams in Finland
Basketball teams established in 1941
Pyrinto
1941 establishments in Finland